Larry Joel Henley (June 30, 1937 – December 18, 2014) was an American singer and songwriter, best known for co-writing (with Jeff Silbar) the 1989 hit record "Wind Beneath My Wings".

Early life
Henley was born to Carl Henley and Helen Quinn in Odessa, Texas on June 30, 1937. He grew up in Odessa, Texas with three sisters, Barbara Henley, Jeanette Henley Chisholm and Pam Lutrell as well as a younger brother, Reggie Henley. He had originally planned on an acting career before becoming a singer and songwriter.

Career
He was the lead singer of the pop group the Newbeats, formed in 1964, singing in a distinctive falsetto. The group had three hits that charted in the top 20 of Billboard magazine, with one of them, "Bread and Butter", reaching No. 2 on the Billboard charts and selling over a million copies. They toured Australia and New Zealand with Roy Orbison, Ray Columbus and the Invaders and the Rolling Stones on the  "Big Beat '65" tour. The group's last single was released in 1974. Henley had a solo album, Piece a Cake, released in 1975.

He co-wrote with Red Lane "'Til I Get It Right" for Tammy Wynette, a 1973 #1 hit on the Billboard Hot Country Singles, later covered by Barbra Streisand and Kenny Rogers. Other #1 country hits were his songs "Is It Still Over?" (performed by Randy Travis), "Lizzie and the Rainman" (performed by Tanya Tucker), and "He's a Heartache (Looking for a Place to Happen)" (performed by Janie Fricke). Other songs included "Shotgun Rider" for Delbert McClinton; "You're Welcome to Tonight" by Lynn Anderson and Gary Morris; and "The World Needs a Melody" by The Carter Family with Johnny Cash.

Henley was a friend of Bobby Goldsboro and it was because of Henley's urging that Goldsboro sang the song "Honey".

He was a 2012 inductee into the Nashville Songwriters Hall of Fame. "Bread and Butter" has been used in Sunbeam Bread advertisements and multiple films, while "Wind Beneath My Wings" was part of the soundtrack for Beaches (1988).
"Love Is on the Air" written by Henley with Jim Hurt and Johnny Slate, performed by Lou Rawls was used in The Cannonball Run.

The song "Wind Beneath My Wings" (written by Henley and Jeff Silbar) was a U.S. #1 hit for Bette Midler and has since totaled around 6 million radio air plays. The song earned Henley and Silbar the Grammy Award for Song of the Year for 1989, and Bette Midler the Record of the Year award. The song was originally recorded by Roger Whittaker in 1982 and has since been covered by numerous artists.

Death
On December 18, 2014, Henley died of Lewy Body Dementia in Nashville, Tennessee at age 77. He had been suffering from Parkinson's and Alzheimer's diseases. He is buried at Kelsey Cemetery in Gilmer, Texas.

References

External links
 Official website
 

1937 births
2014 deaths
Countertenors
Songwriters from Texas
People from Arp, Texas
Deaths from Parkinson's disease
Deaths from Alzheimer's disease
Neurological disease deaths in Tennessee
People from Odessa, Texas